Astra Biltauere (born October 9, 1944) is a former Latvian competitive volleyball player and Olympic silver medalist.

References

External links
 , retrieved 2010-12-11.

Soviet women's volleyball players
Latvian women's volleyball players
Olympic volleyball players of the Soviet Union
Volleyball players at the 1964 Summer Olympics
Olympic silver medalists for the Soviet Union
1944 births
Sportspeople from Riga
Living people
Olympic medalists in volleyball
Medalists at the 1964 Summer Olympics